The 2008 Dwars door Vlaanderen was the 63rd edition of the Dwars door Vlaanderen cycle race and was held on 26 March 2008. The race started in Roeselare and finished in Waregem. The race was won by Sylvain Chavanel.

General classification

References

2008
2008 in road cycling
2008 in Belgian sport
March 2008 sports events in Europe